Koninklijke Maatschappij Sportkring Deinze, or KMSK Deinze, is a Belgian football club founded in 1926 based in Deinze, East Flanders. The club colours are orange and black and the team currently plays in the Challenger Pro League, the second division of Belgian football, having won promotion from the Belgian Second Amateur Division in 2020. Their home stadium is the 7,515-capacity Burgemeester Van de Wiele Stadion.

History
The club was founded on 12 March 1926. On 20 March, the recognition of the Belgian Football Association was received, the club was assigned SK number 818 as SK Deinze. Some important figures during the foundation were children's car manufacturer Emile Torck, his son Georges Torck and garage owner Albert Van Den Poel. They played on a site near Astenedreef. In the following years Deinze almost always played in the higher provincial series.

In 1940 the activities were interrupted, the site had been transformed into a junkyard. During the Second World War, the association was further expanded under President Georges Torck and Vice President Achiel De Clercq, as well as hockey, swimming and table tennis. From 1946 it was kept with football again.

In the following years, the club's rise continued, playing in the national promotion series or in the highest provincial series. In 1978 the team moved to the new Burgemeester Van de Wiele Stadium in De Brielmeersen, laid out by the city council. In 1982 Deinze last played in the provincial departments, that year another promotion to promotion was enforced. In 1988, Georges Torck retired as chairman, CEO Marc Hoste succeeded him.

In 1992 and 1993, Deinze celebrated two consecutive championship titles, making it second national. In 1997, the club reached the final round under the leadership of trainer Eddy Mestdagh, but a promotion to first class did not work. In 2001 Deinze only through additional sports grounds could ensure conservation in second class, when KFC Turnhout (become the second was) received a license from the Belgian FA and relegated.

At the end of the 2008–09 season, Deinze relegated to third division, where it spent six seasons. In the 2009–10 season, Deinze was allowed to participate in the final round for promotion, but lost to ROC de Charleroi-Marchienne. Three years later, Deinze also fought for promotion via the final round. The club had only finished thirteenth that season, but had won a period title. In the final round was lost to KRC Mechelen. A year later (season 2013–14) Deinze took part in the final round again, but lost to Union Saint-Gilloise. A year later, the promotion to second class finally followed.

Since the league reform in 2016, Deinze played in the First Division amateurs.

In 2017, the club bought the Mayor Van de Wielestadion for €521,000 from the city.

From the 2020–21 season, Deinze will play in First Division B (football Belgium), after having been in first place when the competition came to an end in 2019–20.

Current squad

Out on loan

Staff

  Antonio Calderón (interim manager)
  René van Eck (assistant manager)
  Marc Gamon (goalkeepers coach)
  Adrián Espárraga (technical director)

References

External links
  
  a kern seizoen 2015–16 (archived 18 January 2016)

1926 establishments in Belgium
Association football clubs established in 1926
Football clubs in Belgium
Organisations based in Belgium with royal patronage
Sport in East Flanders